InkStop, Inc. was an office supply retailer founded in 2005 and most recently headquartered in Warrensville Heights, Ohio. On October 1, 2009, operations were stopped until further notice by the Board of Directors. On November 5, 2009, InkStop filed for Chapter 7 bankruptcy.

History

Beginnings 
In 2004, InkStop founder and CEO, Dirk Kettlewell, was Vice President of Technology at OfficeMax, but decided to leave based on the impending move of the company headquarters to Chicago by Boise Cascade, which acquired OfficeMax in 2003.
He took with him his eventual wife, Dawn (Callahan) Kettlewell, who was Vice President of Merchandising at OfficeMax, and several others to create InkStop, which was to be focused on profiting from mainly ink and toner sales in smaller stores giving convenience and better customer service than the competition.

Fast growth
After its first location opened up in Independence, Ohio in 2006, InkStop grew to operate as many as 162 stores in 14 states. In April 2009, RBC Global Capital Markets ranked the company one of the 30 fastest-growing retailers nationwide.

Abrupt end
On October 1, 2009, after calls were made and a memo was sent out at the end of the day of business, all operations were ceased immediately by the Board of Directors,
which includes former NFL quarterback Boomer Esiason.
The employees were not given their last two paychecks following this action.

On November 5, 2009, InkStop filed for Chapter 7 bankruptcy. The filing states the company owes $48.3 million to more than a 1,000 creditors. The company also owes $1.1 million to its former employees for wages not paid for the last 3 weeks worked as well as vacation pay and unpaid expenses.

At the December 5, 2009 bankruptcy hearing, it was learned that several investors were paid nearly $5.3 million to its directors and senior managers, including "$109,268 to Norman "Boomer" Esiason."

Legal actions

Warren et al. v. Inkstop, Inc. et al. 

On October 4, 2009, a class action suit was filed in Ohio Northern District Court against InkStop as well as Dirk and Dawn Kettlewell for unpaid wages and benefits.

See also
 Closure (business)

References

External links
 InkStop Letter to Employees on Cleveland.com
 InkStop pays employee insurance premiums for September, coverage ended on Oct. 1 The Plain Dealer 2009-10-06.
 Warren et al. v. Inkstop, Inc. et al. on Justia.com
 DeGreen et al. v. Kettlewell et al. on Justia.com
 InkStop runs dry leaving ex-employees unpaid and unhappy St. Louis Post-Dispatch 2009-10-05.
 InkStop Inc. abruptly closes all its stores Crain's Cleveland Business 2009-10-02.
 InkStop shutters stores without warning MySanAntonio.com 2009-10-22.
 InkStop Stores Close With Little Notice KTVI FOX 2 St. Louis 2009-10-29.
 Activists demand that InkStop pay its workers' overdue wages The Plain Dealer 2009-10-28.
 InkStop files for Chapter 7 bankruptcy The Plain Dealer 2009-11-10.

American companies established in 2005
American companies disestablished in 2009
Retail companies established in 2005
Retail companies disestablished in 2009
Defunct retail companies of the United States
Office supply retailers of the United States
Companies that have filed for Chapter 7 bankruptcy
Defunct companies based in Ohio
2005 establishments in Ohio
2009 disestablishments in Ohio